Orense may refer to:
Ourense, a city in northwestern Spain, named Orense in Spanish
Province of Ourense, a province in northwestern Spain
Valle del Miño-Orense, a wine region in northwestern Spain

Orense S.C., an Ecuadorian association football club

See also
Ourense (disambiguation)